The 1953 Tour de France was the 40th edition of the Tour de France, taking place from 3 to 26 July.

The race was won by Louison Bobet, the first of his three consecutive wins. At first, internal struggles in the French national team seemed to work against Bobet, but when the team joined forces, he beat regional rider Jean Malléjac in the mountains.

The 1953 Tour de France saw the introduction of the points classification, which gives the green jersey to its leader. In 1953 this was won by Fritz Schär.

Innovations and changes
Changes in the Tour formula were made: Only one time trial was used, instead of two the previous year; the time bonus for the first cyclist to cross a mountain top was removed; there were fewer mountain stages; the number of cyclists per team was increased from 8 to 10. Since all these changes were bad for 1952's winner Fausto Coppi, who had gained significant time in 1952 in the time trials and mountain stages, the Tour organisation was accused of favoring French riders.

Teams

As was the custom since the 1930 Tour de France, the 1953 Tour de France was contested by national and regional teams. Seven national teams were sent, with 10 cyclists each from Italy, Switzerland, Belgium, Spain, Luxembourg, the Netherlands and France. France additionally sent five regional teams from 10 cyclists each, divided into Île-de-France, Center-North East France, South-East, West and South West. One Luxembourgian cyclist did not start, so 119 cyclists started the race.

The teams entering the race were:

 Italy
 Switzerland
 Belgium
 Spain
 Luxembourg
 Netherlands
 France
 Île-de-France
 North-East/Centre
 South-East
 West
 South-West

Pre-race favourites

The winner of the previous edition, Coppi, did not defend his title. The reasons were not clear: it could have been injury, but it was also possible that Coppi did not want to ride in the same team as his rival Gino Bartali, or that the Tour direction urged the Italian team not to select Coppi because he had dominated the 1952 Tour, or that Coppi chose to prepare for the 1953 UCI Road World Championships. The big favourites became Hugo Koblet and Louison Bobet.

The last five editions had been won by Italian and Swiss cyclists, so the French cycling fans were anxious for a French win. When team manager Marcel Bidot had selected Bobet as the French team captain, controversy arose. Bobet had shown his potential strength, but had already tried to win the Tour de France five times without succeeding. His team-mate Raphaël Géminiani thought that Bobet was not strong enough, after he did not finish the 1953 Giro d'Italia earlier that year.

Route and stages

The 1953 Tour de France started on 3 July, and had two rest days, in Bordeaux and Monaco.

Race overview

In the first two stages Fritz Schär won the sprint. The favourites remained calm. After the fourth stage, French Roger Hassenforder took the lead, but he soon lost it when the mountains appeared.

Hassenforder was ill, and could not follow in the mountains, so Schär took the lead back in the ninth stage. In the next stage, Hugo Koblet, the leader of the Swiss team, fell and had to give up, making Schär the undisputed leader of the Swiss team.

Jean Robic, the winner of the 1947 Tour de France, rode for the regional team from West. He was in great shape, and won the 11th stage, and even took the leading position in the general classification. In the next stage, Robic rode in the yellow jersey for the first and only time in his career. Robic had won the 1947 Tour de France, but only captured the lead in the ultimate stage, so he never wore the yellow jersey during that race. Robic was a good climber, but he was not heavy enough to be a good descender. It is said that the manager of his team had arranged bidons filled with lead, that would be given to Robic on the top of the mountains. This helped Robic to keep his lead on the descent.

Robic lost the yellow jersey in the next stage, after he crashed and the French national team attacked. A large group of twenty five cyclists, without any of the favourites, had escaped and stayed away. Robic's team did not lose the jersey however, as first François Mahé took over the lead.

In the next stage, the favourites attacked again. Mahé could not keep up, and lost his leading position to his team-mate Jean Malléjac. The sprint was won by Nello Lauredi from the French national team, before his team-mate Bobet. Bobet was angry that Lauredi had won the sprint, because it made Bobet miss the one-minute time bonus for the winner of the stage. Bobet accused Lauredi and Géminiani of working against him, and during dinner it came to a fight. The French team captain intervened, and they found a solution: Bobet agreed to give his prize money to his team-mates, if they helped him win the Tour.

In that stage, Robic had fallen down, and lost many minutes, so he was no longer considered able to win the Tour. He did not start the fourteenth stage. At that point, Bobet was 3 minutes 13 seconds behind Malléjac.

In the eighteenth stage in the alps, Bobet followed Jesús Loroño who attacked on the Col de Vars. Bobet dropped him on the descend, and went alone to the Col d'Izoard. There was a group of early attackers ahead, including Bobet's team-mate Deledda. Deledda waited for Bobet, and helped him to reach the Izoard. Bobet could save his energy, and when they reached the Izoard, he left Deledda behind. The tactics had worked, and Bobet won more than 12 minutes on Malléjac and took the yellow jersey. He extended his lead by winning the time trial in stage 20, thereby showing that he was not only a good climber but also a fine time trialist. At that point, the Dutch team was leading the team classification, and the Dutch and French team started to work together to keep their leading positions in the general and team classification.

For the finish in Paris, eleven former Tour de France winners were present: Maurice Garin (who won the 1903 edition), Gustave Garrigou (1911), Philippe Thys (1913, 1914 and 1920), Lucien Buysse (1926), André Leducq (1930 and 1932), Antonin Magne (1931 and 1934), Georges Speicher (1933), Romain Maes (1935), Sylvère Maes (1936 and 1939), Roger Lapébie (1937) and Ferdinand Kübler (1950).

Classification leadership and minor prizes

The time that each cyclist required to finish each stage was recorded, and these times were added together for the general classification. If a cyclist had received a time bonus, it was subtracted from this total; all time penalties were added to this total. The cyclist with the least accumulated time was the race leader, identified by the yellow jersey. Of the 119 cyclists that started the 1953 Tour de France, 76 finished the race. The results showed that the pre-war greats were no longer dominant: all cyclists in the top ten had turned professional after the Second World War. The prize for best regional cyclist was won by second-placed Malléjac.

The classification was based on the points system as it had been used from the 1905 Tour de France to the 1912 Tour de France. The points classification was not only added to celebrate the 50 years since the first race, but also to have the sprinters race hard for the entire race. The calculation method came from the Tours de France from 1905 to 1912. Points were given according to the ranking of the stage: the winner received one points, the next cyclist two points, and so on. These points were added, and the cyclist with the fewest points was the leader of the points classification. In 1953, this was won by Fritz Schär.

Points for the mountains classification were earned by reaching the mountain tops first. The system was almost the same as in 1952: there were two types of mountain tops: the hardest ones, in category 1, gave 10 points to the first cyclist, the easier ones, in category 2, gave 6 points to the first cyclist, and the easiest ones, in category 3, gave 3 points. Jesús Loroño won this classification.

The calculation of the team classification was changed from the calculation in 1952. In 1953, it was calculated as the sum of the daily team classifications, and the daily team classification was calculated by adding the times in the stage result of the best three cyclists per team. It was won by the Dutch team, with a small margin over the French team. South West did not finish with three cyclists so was not eligible for the team classification.

The 1952 Tour had seen the introduction of combativity awards, in which a jury composed of journalists gave points after most stages to the cyclist they considered most combative. In 1953, this system was kept, with the addition of a classification that was led by the rider with the most points from votes in all stages, and an overall super-combativity award. This was won by Wout Wagtmans. The Souvenir Henri Desgrange was given in honour of Tour founder Henri Desgrange to the first rider to pass a point by his final residence, the "Villa Mia" in Beauvallon, Grimaud, on the French Riviera on stage 16. This prize was won by Claude Colette.

Final standings

General classification

Points classification

Mountains classification

Team classification

Aftermath
The 1953 Tour de France had two young rider making their debuts, Charly Gaul and André Darrigade. Gaul would later win the 1958 Tour de France, and Darrigade would win 22 stages in total, and win the points classification twice.

It was the last Tour that Gino Bartali rode. Bartali started eight Tours, and won two of them.

The winner of the 1953 Tour, Bobet, would also win the next two editions, and became the first rider to win three consecutive Tours.

Notes

References

Bibliography

External links

 
1953
1953 in French sport
1953 in road cycling
July 1953 sports events in Europe
1953 Challenge Desgrange-Colombo